The Town of Boone is a Statutory Town located in Pueblo County, Colorado, United States. The town population was 305 at the 2020 United States Census. Boone is a part of the Pueblo, CO Metropolitan Statistical Area and the Front Range Urban Corridor.

History
Boone was founded as Booneville during the Pikes Peak Gold Rush by Albert Gallatin Boone, a grandson of Daniel Boone. Boone was the first postmaster and for a brief time Indian agent to the Cheyenne and Arapaho.

Geography
Boone is located at  (38.250083, -104.255166).

At the 2020 United States Census, the town had a total area of  including  of water.

Demographics

As of the census of 2000, there were 323 people, 131 households, and 89 families residing in the town. The racial makeup of the town was 93.50% White, 0.62% African American, 0.62% Native American, 1.55% from other races, and 3.72% from two or more races. Hispanic or Latino of any race were 31.58% of the population.

There were 131 households, out of which 26.0% had children under the age of 18 living with them, 50.4% were married couples living together, 14.5% had a female householder with no husband present, and 31.3% were non-families. 26.0% of all households were made up of individuals, and 14.5% had someone living alone who was 65 years of age or older.  The average household size was 2.38 and the average family size was 2.84.

In the town, the population was spread out, with 23.2% under the age of 18, 7.1% from 18 to 24, 22.6% from 25 to 44, 22.3% from 45 to 64, and 24.8% who were 65 years of age or older.  The median age was 43 years. For every 100 females, there were 88.9 males.  For every 100 females age 18 and over, there were 89.3 males.

The median income for a household in the town was $26,250, and the median income for a family was $26,964. Males had a median income of $26,563 versus $21,875 for females. The per capita income for the town was $18,628.  About 7.8% of families and 16.0% of the population were below the poverty line, including 28.9% of those under age 18 and 13.0% of those age 65 or over.

See also

 List of municipalities in Colorado

References

External links

 CDOT map of the Town of Boone

Towns in Pueblo County, Colorado
Towns in Colorado